Altona is an unincorporated community and a census-designated place (CDP) located in and governed by Boulder County, Colorado, United States. The CDP is a part of the Boulder, CO Metropolitan Statistical Area. The population of the Altona CDP was 501 at the United States Census 2010. The Boulder post office (Zip Code 80302) serves the area.

Geography
Altona is located in central Boulder County where Left Hand Creek exits the Front Range of the Colorado Rockies. U.S. Highway 36 passes through the community, leading north to Lyons and south to Boulder.

The Altona CDP has an area of  including  of water.

Demographics

See also

Outline of Colorado
Index of Colorado-related articles
State of Colorado
Colorado cities and towns
Colorado census designated places
Colorado counties
Boulder County, Colorado
Colorado metropolitan areas
Front Range Urban Corridor
North Central Colorado Urban Area
Denver-Aurora-Boulder, CO Combined Statistical Area
Boulder, CO Metropolitan Statistical Area

References

External links

Altona @ Ghosttowns.com
Historic Altona School
Boulder County website
Altona Grange #127

Census-designated places in Boulder County, Colorado
Census-designated places in Colorado